The Gymnázium Šrobárova  is one of the oldest high schools in Košice, Slovakia. Gymnázium provides upper-secondary education for over 600 students.

History

It was founded in 1891 as a State Girls High School (Állami felsőbb leányiskola). The first school leaving exams (maturita) took part June 23, 1923.  After the fall of the Austro-Hungarian Empire, the government of Czechoslovakia altered the school into a college-preparatory high school.

Architecture
The school seats in a complex of school buildings from 1896 on the western edge of city center. Design of school complex came from Gyula Pártos, the Hungarian architect. The construction was led by company of Arpád and Gejza Jakab.
Complex is designed in the Secession style.

Notable alumni
Jozef Urban - poet
Richard Raši - politician
 Peter Schultz - journalist

Gymnasiums in Slovakia
Schools in Slovakia
Education in Slovakia
Buildings and structures in Košice